Dr. Gyan Prakash Pilania (born 18 February 1932 in Sri Ganga Nagar Rajasthan) is a politician from Rajasthan, India. He was member of Rajya Sabha, Bharatiya Janta Party, from Rajasthan during 2004-2008 and 2008-14. Currently is member of National People's Party

He is a social reformer and leader of farmers in Rajasthan. He joined Indian Police Service in 1955 from Rajasthan Cadre. He was elected to Rajya Sabha.

References 

1932 births
Bharatiya Janata Party politicians from Rajasthan
Indian police chiefs
Rajasthani people
Living people
People from Sri Ganganagar district
Rajya Sabha members from Rajasthan
National People's Party (India) politicians
Members of the Rajasthan Legislative Assembly